Provincial Road 399 (PR 399) is a provincial road in the Canadian province of Manitoba. It runs from PR 391 in Lynn Lake to PR 397 in Lynn Lake. The route was designated in 1966 as part of a mass numbering of roads through the northern part of the province.

Junction list

References

External links 
 Manitoba government Official Highway Map

399